Nancy Goldsmith (נאנסי גולדשמידט; born August 4, 1966) is an Israeli former Olympic gymnast.

Early life and gymnastics career
Goldsmith is Jewish.  Much of her training was at the National Academy of Artistic Gymnastics in Eugene, Oregon.

She attended Stanford University starting in January 1984, and competed on the gymnastics team while a member of the Israel national team.  In 1984, Goldsmith was named All-Western Collegiate Athletic Association.  In 1987, she was named Stanford's Most Outstanding Gymnast.

Goldsmith competed for Israel at the 1984 Summer Olympics in Los Angeles, California, at the age of 17 in gymnastics.  In the Women's Individual All-Around she came in 31st out of 65 competitors. When she competed in the Olympics she was 5-2.5 (160 cm) tall and weighed 99 lbs (45 kg).

References

External links
 

Living people
Gymnasts at the 1984 Summer Olympics
1966 births
Israeli female artistic gymnasts
Olympic gymnasts of Israel
Jewish gymnasts
Stanford University alumni
Sportspeople from Eugene, Oregon